Mount Eielson is a  summit located in the Alaska Range, in Denali National Park and Preserve, in Alaska, United States. Originally called Copper Mountain, this mountain was renamed by the U.S. Congress on June 14, 1930, to honor Carl Ben Eielson (1897–1929), for the pioneering work in aviation he performed in Alaska. Ben Eielson made the first airplane landing near Copper Mountain in Mount McKinley National Park, as it was known at that time.

Climate

Based on the Köppen climate classification, Mount Eielson is located in a subarctic climate zone with long, cold, snowy winters, and mild summers. Temperatures can drop below −20 °C with wind chill factors below −30 °C. The months May through June offer the most favorable weather for climbing or viewing. Precipitation runoff from the mountain drains north into tributaries of the McKinley River, which in turn is part of in the Tanana River drainage basin.

See also

List of mountain peaks of Alaska
Geology of Alaska

References

External links
 Weather forecast: Mount Eielson
 Mt. Eielson: Flickr photo
 Mt. Eielson: Flickr photo

Eielson
Eielson
Eielson
Eielson
Eielson